The Offshore Super Series (OSS) is an offshore powerboat racing organization founded in December 2003 by 2 of the top offshore race boat teams in the United States. OSS is organized as a not for profit corporation, run by a democratically elected Board of Directors. OSS is organized into classes of race boats. Each class bringing 5 or more member boats to OSS has a right to nominate two directors on the OSS Board. The basic principle is “one boat, one vote.”

Founding board

The OSS founding board consisted of nine directors. Each OSS Board member is elected for a two-year term.

The OSS Not-For Profit Corporation was represented by Paul Whittier, President, Billy Mauff, Vice President, Gerry Chastelet, Treasurer, and Bertel Schmitt, Secretary. Gerry Chastelet served as Director At Large, and Paul Whittier served as Chairman.

Classes

 The OSSC (OSS Cat) class was represented by Billy Mauff and Tom Abrams.
 The OSSCL(OSS Cat Lite) class was represented by Paul Whittier and Bob Teague.
 The OSSV (OSS Vee ) class was represented by Todd Welling and Jim Richardson.
 The OSSVL (OSS Vee Lite) class was represented by Bertel Schmitt  and Ben Hedrick.

Since inception, OSS added three more classes:

 OSSCO (OSS Cat Outboard,)
 OSSCX (OSS Cat Extreme,) and 
 OSSTX (OSS  Turbine Extreme.)

The class speeds range from approximately 90mp/h for the OSSVL boats to 200 mp/h and more for the OSSTX boats.

Races

Each year, OSS conducts approximately 10 OSS races  which are held in a circuit racing format, usually close to shore to achieve a better spectator experience. At each of the races, points are awarded, which are tabulated in the national standings.  The highest points count at the end of the year determines the OSS National Champion. Usually in November, OSS conducts a World Championship, which is held over the course of a week. This World Championship is open to members of other race organizations. In 2006, OSS entered a  5-year contract with Destin, Florida, to host OSS World Championships.

Foundations

The foundations of OSS are fairness and safety.

Rules

The races are governed by two sets of rules: The OSS General Membership & Racing Rules, and the OSS Technical Rules.

 The OSS General Membership & Racing Rules define the workings of the association and the conduct of the races. They are written with input from the complete membership, and approved by their board representatives.
 The OSS Technical Rules  mainly define the set-up of the boats in each class. The Technical Rules  are written with input from their classes. The classes vote on their own rules and send them to the board for approval.

Safety

To assure the highest level of safety, OSS only allows fully canopied (closed cockpit) boats which should meet or exceed the internationally accepted Lavin Guidelines. Each of the OSS races is covered by a large safety and rescue team. At each race, OSS has two of its own rescue helicopters (“Angel Ships”) with specially trained rescue jumper/divers. Their target is to come to the assistance of a boat, when needed, within 50 seconds of an accident.

External links
 Offshore Super Series (OSS) website

Motorboat racing